At the Drive-In is an American post-hardcore band from El Paso, Texas, formed in 1994. The band's most recent line-up consisted of Cedric Bixler-Zavala (vocals), Omar Rodríguez-López (guitar, vocals), Paul Hinojos (bass), Tony Hajjar (drums) and Keeley Davis (guitar, vocals).

After several early line-up changes, the band solidified into a five-piece, consisting of Bixler-Zavala, Rodríguez-López, Jim Ward, Hinojos and Hajjar. At the Drive-In released three studio albums and five EPs before breaking up in 2001. Their third and final album before their split, 2000's Relationship of Command, received a number of accolades and is cited as a landmark of the post-hardcore genre. Following the breakup, Bixler-Zavala and Rodríguez-López formed the Mars Volta while Ward, Hinojos, and Hajjar formed Sparta; Hinojos would later join the Mars Volta.

At the Drive-In reunited in January 2012 and played the 2012 Coachella Valley Music and Arts Festival, as well as the 2012 Lollapalooza Festival. In 2016, the band reunited for a second time, with guitarist and occasional lead vocalist Jim Ward no longer participating. He was replaced by Sparta's Keeley Davis. The band released their fourth studio album, in•ter a•li•a, in 2017. The band announced an indefinite hiatus in November 2018.

History

Formation and Acrobatic Tenement (1994–97)

At the Drive-In was founded in 1994 by guitarist Jim Ward and vocalist Cedric Bixler-Zavala. The newly formed band played its first live show on October 14, 1994, at The Attic, a venue in El Paso, Texas, followed up by a show on the 15th at the Loretto High School Fair. Not long after, At the Drive-In released its first studio recording entitled Hell Paso, a 7-inch EP issued in November 1994. Following Hell Paso release, the band members embarked on their first tour – a 2,000-mile trek across the state of Texas. After a drummer change due to Bernie Rincon's death, At the Drive-In released its second EP ¡Alfaro Vive, Carajo! in June 1995. The band then set out on another tour, this one in a newly purchased 1981 Ford Econoline and spanning 42 days and 10,000 miles across the United States. During these tours, At the Drive-In began developing a large underground following by mostly playing in basements and small venues across the western United States, with their popularity spread by word of mouth among fans. One such show that changed the course of history for the band was in a now defunct bar in Los Angeles, where the band put on an explosive performance for just nine people – some of them employees of the Flipside record label. The staffers were so enthralled by the show that they offered to put out At the Drive-In's record then and there. Accepting the offer, the band first headed out on another 21-day tour of the Southwest before ending in Los Angeles again where they recorded their debut full-length album titled Acrobatic Tenement for $600.

The album was released August 18, 1996, and the band commenced another tour of the United States the following year spanning 100 days (February to June 1997) and 24,000 miles. This tour included shows with hundreds of other bands such as Screw 32, J Church, AFI, Still Life, Mustard Plug, Face to Face, and Cosmic Psychos. At the Drive-In's fan base began to swell with every show it performed. Following this tour, the band members took a month vacation (Jim Ward remained on vacation until the recording of In/Casino/Out) before rehearsing for their next record and subsequent tour.
Following the recording of Acrobatic Tenement in July 1996, the final line-up of At the Drive-In fell into place with the addition of Tony Hajjar and Paul Hinojos and with Omar Rodríguez-López transitioning from bass to guitar. At the Drive-In's third EP titled El Gran Orgo was released on September 18, 1997, and "showed a more melodic side of the band, but the musical depth and heartfelt emotion was never more apparent." Two days after its release, the band was in Boulder, Colorado, playing a show with Welt to kick off its next 35-day, 11,000-mile tour that also included six dates with Karp and the Young Pioneers, and one-offs with Guttermouth, The Criminals, Piss Drunks, and the Humpers. At the Drive-In's popularity at this point was undeniable, with headlining shows in the Midwest drawing between 100 and 350 fans.

In/Casino/Out and Vaya (1998–1999)

When the time came for At the Drive-In's next recording, Flipside quit producing records and Offtime was financially unable to, "so the band figuratively approached almost every indie label they could think of." When hope was almost lost and the possibility of another record seemed dim, Bob and Michelle Becker of Fearless Records saw At the Drive-In open for Supernova at a bar named Club Mesa. Despite Fearless's history of producing mainly pop punk bands, the band members "felt very comfortable with Bob and Michelle on a personal level" and a deal was signed. Consequently, At the Drive-In began recording its second full-length album titled In/Casino/Out on June 3, 1998. With producer and mixer Alex Newport, the band spent four days recording at Doug Messenger's, in North Hollywood, Revolver Recordings in Costa Mesa with Engineer Andy Troy for Fearless Records, and an additional two days mixing the album at Paramount, in Hollywood. This album marked a notable maturation in At the Drive-In's sound and is special in that it was recorded live with just a small number of overdubs. In/Casino/Out was chosen to be recorded live because, according to some sources, At the Drive-In struggled to capture the intensity and emotion of its live shows in the recording studio.

In/Casino/Out was released on August 18, 1998, although the band toured almost non-stop from July until December, playing shows with bands like Knapsack and The Murder City Devils. At the Drive-In took a couple month break until March 1999, at which point they kicked off another tour with a two-week stint with Jimmy Eat World in the United States until they headed to Europe for a six-week European tour spanning eleven countries. Upon returning to the United States, At the Drive-In played a handful of shows before returning to the studio to record their fourth EP entitled Vaya, which was released on July 13, 1999. Without missing a beat, the band kicked off another tour on July 28 at Emo's in Austin, Texas, with El Paso band Universal Recovered and Austin band Schatzi opening this show. This tour included shows with bands like The Get Up Kids and Rage Against the Machine. Later, in April 2000, At the Drive-In released a split EP with the Czech band Sunshine, containing five songs, two of them by At the Drive-In.

Relationship of Command (2000–2001)

Recording for At the Drive-In's third and then-final full-length album Relationship of Command began on January 17, 2000. The recording took place at Indigo Ranch Studios in Malibu, California, with producer Ross Robinson (and mixer Andy Wallace), who the band had met on an earlier tour and who had "convinced the boys that he was the guy who could get every ounce of them onto tape." Relationship of Command was recorded over a seven-week period and featured Iggy Pop with minor parts on a couple of the album's songs. It was released September 12, 2000, to critical acclaim, and catapulted At the Drive-In into the mainstream musical spotlight.

In addition to touring worldwide in Europe, Japan, and the United States following the release of Relationship of Command, At The Drive-In performed on several television shows. The band's first nationally televised performance was on Farmclub, a now defunct television show which aired late at night on the USA Network. After that performance, they also appeared on Later with Jools Holland, Late Night with Conan O'Brien and the Late Show with David Letterman. Additionally, their minor hit radio single "One Armed Scissor" had circulation on MTV and significantly contributed to the band's popularity. By 2002, Relationship of Command had sold 273,000 copies in the United States, according to Nielsen SoundScan.

Breakup (2001)
On November 12, 2000, At the Drive-In was involved in a motor vehicle accident when their touring van skidded out of control on ice and flipped onto its roof. Though the accident left the band shaken, none of the members sustained serious injury – Hajjar and Bixler-Zavala were taken to the hospital for minor injuries and released. In January 2001, At the Drive-In traveled to Australia for the Big Day Out music festival. While performing in Sydney, they left partway through their set after telling the attendance to calm down and observe the safety rules against moshing. After the refusal of the crowd, frontman Cedric Bixler-Zavala told them "You're a robot, you're a sheep!" and bleated at them several times before the band left the stage after performing only three songs. "I think it's a very, very sad day when the only way you can express yourself is through slam-dancing", he proclaimed. The following month, At the Drive-In cancelled the last five dates of its European tour, citing "complete mental and physical exhaustion" of the members.

In March 2001—less than a month away from a United States tour set to begin on April 14—at the peak of their popularity and following a world tour, At the Drive-In broke up, initially referring to the split as an "indefinite hiatus". The band played their last show at Groningen's Vera venue on February 21, 2001. A combination of excessive hype, relentless touring, artistic differences, and Rodríguez-López and Bixler-Zavala's drug habits contributed to the demise of the band. Commenting on the hiatus, guitarist Rodríguez-López said: "After a non-stop six-year cycle of record/tour/record/tour, we are going on an indefinite hiatus. We need time to rest up and re-evaluate, just to be human beings again and to decide when we feel like playing music again."

Cedric Bixler-Zavala took responsibility for the breakup, saying repeatedly in interviews that he felt almost as if At the Drive-In was holding him back and that he didn't want his music to be confined to punk or hardcore — that it should encompass many genres and be even more progressive, alternative, and "against-the-grain." Bixler-Zavala and Rodríguez-López had stated that they wanted their next album to sound like Pink Floyd's The Piper at the Gates of Dawn, while the other members were intent on progressing in a more alternative rock direction.

Post-breakup activity (2001–2009)
Following the break-up of At the Drive-In, Bixler-Zavala and Rodríguez-López focused on their dub side-project De Facto, before starting The Mars Volta. This project was a departure from their previous work, as it pursued the progressive rock sound that they had been interested in. Meanwhile, the other members – Ward, Hinojos, and Hajjar – started the more traditional band Sparta. Hinojos would then leave Sparta to join Bixler-Zavala and Rodríguez-López in The Mars Volta from 2005 to 2009. The Mars Volta disbanded in 2013, and Rodríguez-López went on to play with Bosnian Rainbows, while Bixler-Zavala started a new band called Zavalaz. Bixler-Zavala and Rodríguez-López eventually reunited once again and formed Antemasque in 2014.

First reunion (2009–2012)
During an interview with Drowned in Sound in June 2009, Bixler-Zavala stated that he had been in discussions with the band's former members and suggested that they could get back together after they sorted their financial business out. He added, "I wouldn't mind it. It might happen, we just have to iron out a lot of personal things. A lot of it we've dealt with already and I've apologized for a lot of things I've said and the way it ended... we'll see what happens."

In response to Bixler-Zavala's comments, guitarist Jim Ward quickly quashed rumors of a reunion by stating "I don't think that I'll be answering any questions or doing any interviews anymore, thank you very much. I haven't got much to say about anything except with songs which I will continue to make and release."

At the Drive-in finally got back together in late 2011 and officially announced their reunion on January 9, 2012. They played their first show since 2001 on April 9 at Red 7 in Austin, Texas, as part of a 4-date tour across Texas with Zechs Marquise warming up prior to performing at the Coachella Valley Music and Arts Festival on April 15 and 22. Later in the year At the Drive-in also performed at festivals such as Lollapalooza, Splendour in the Grass, Fuji Rock and Reading and Leeds Festival.

The band had also acquired the rights from Fearless Records to reissue most of their catalogue (three full-length albums as well as Vaya EP) and launched their own label, Twenty-first Chapter, to handle the reissues. The name of the label is a reference to the chapter omitted from the US version of the Anthony Burgess book A Clockwork Orange.

While the reunion shows were met with mostly positive reviews, Rodríguez-López received criticism from fans and observers for his evident lack of enthusiasm while playing on stage; initially this was attributed to the recent death of his mother; however, Rodríguez-López later stated that he also no longer felt connected with At the Drive-in's music.

Rodríguez-López also ruled out the possibility of the band recording new material, though he reversed this stance in light of the band's 2016 reunion.

Following the dissolution of The Mars Volta in 2013, Bixler-Zavala and Rodríguez-López ceased all contact with each other. Bixler-Zavala blamed Rodríguez-López for the breakup on Twitter; however, he stated that he was still happy with At the Drive-In's reunion: "And for the record I'm still in love with ATDI. Proof was in MY performance. I would never get on stage if my heart was elsewhere." The two subsequently focused their efforts on their respective projects, Zavalaz and Bosnian Rainbows, and remained on non-speaking terms until early 2014, when they finally resolved their issues. An initial attempt to restart At the Drive-In didn't work out, however, so Bixler-Zavala and Rodríguez-López went on to form Antemasque, touring and recording for the next two years.

Second reunion and in•ter a•li•a (2015–2018)

In October 2015, At the Drive-In agreed on doing another reunion, and an appearance at Rock On The Range festival in the following May was scheduled. In January 2016, trailed by a 15-second video of seemingly new music, the band detailed plans for a world tour and new album later in the year. After initial rehearsals, Jim Ward left the reunited band, and was replaced by his former Sparta bandmate Keeley Davis.

Looking back on Ward's departure, in 2017 Bixler-Zavala stated that Ward wasn't ready for a new album and tour: "His head wasn't there. His head wasn't trustworthy. Because of the way Omar and I exploded [with Mars Volta], I completely understood that. You know, you either let it go and keep going forward, or the train goes on without you. We have to honor what is happening now, which is age and the want to do it. I love him. He's a beautiful human being. A beautiful artist. I just wish he would remember that he's an amazing guitar player. I don't know if he does."

The band canceled part of their North American tour after Bixler-Zavala began to have issues with his voice.  On December 8, the band released their first new song in 16 years, "Governed by Contagions", through Rise Records. A new album, in•ter a•li•a, was released on May 5, 2017, preceded by another single, "Incurably Innocent". The Diamanté EP was released on November 24 as part of Record Store Day; it had a limited vinyl release of 4000 copies. In May 2018, the band headlined the Neon Desert Music Festival.

Hiatus (2018–present)
During a show on November 17, 2018, at the Circo Voador in Brazil, Bixler-Zavala announced to the crowd that the following night's show would be their final show for the foreseeable future. That night, Bixler-Zavala posted on Twitter stating "Maybe it's a sign of weakness to some of you but I had to give a huge thank you to my ATDI family. This was our 2nd to last show. Tomorrow is the last. Don't know when we'll play again. Thank you Rio. How do I even sleep now?" The following day on November 18, 2018, the band played their final show at Bar Opinião in Porto Alegre, Brazil. On November 19, 2018, the band released a statement on their official Instagram announcing a hiatus.

Musical style and influences
At the Drive-In's style is usually described as post-hardcore. Their sound has also been called punk rock, emo, and art punk. Some of the group's influences are Indian Summer, Swing Kids, Fugazi, Sunny Day Real Estate (referred to by Ward as "Fugazi beyond Fugazi"), Bad Brains, and the Gravity Records-led post-hardcore sound of the 1990s that featured acts such as Antioch Arrow and Heroin. In their last period before their initial breakup, the biggest influences of At the Drive-In included bands such as Drive Like Jehu and The Nation of Ulysses, with frontman Bixler-Zavala going on to say that "there would be no Relationship of Command without Drive Like Jehu."  The band also performed cover versions of songs such as "This Night Has Opened My Eyes" by The Smiths and "Take Up Thy Stethoscope and Walk" by Pink Floyd, both included in the 2004 compilation This Station Is Non-Operational. Their name was taken from the fact that Bad Brains took their name from the Ramones' song "Bad Brain" (from Road to Ruin), and Bixler-Zavala liked the Bad Brains' song title "At the Movies" (track featured in Rock for Light); while Ward liked "at the drive-in", and his suggestion would eventually win out.

Though In/Casino/Out was recorded live, "Relationship of Command may very well be the first record to harness the chaotic balance of adrenaline and intellect of ATDI's live performance." "Ross was instrumental in bringing out a lot of feeling from us," Bixler-Zavala recalls. "We channeled a lot of emotion into this record. He pushed us farther than we thought we could go. I learned to cut loose the way we do live and not to be afraid to break something or whatever." While capturing the essence of ATDI's live shows in a way never before seen, the record also featured some of the band's most experimental songs, including "Rolodex Propaganda," "Non-Zero Possibility," and "Invalid Litter Dept."

The band's guitar-playing, in the majority of their songs, is characterized by unusual chords, a fast tempo, and a quiet-loud-quiet song structure. While Jim Ward and Paul Hinojos provided the rhythmic structure of the song, Omar Rodriguez-Lopez often played more experimental riffs and melodies over the top. Effects were heavily used by Rodriguez-Lopez, especially on Relationship of Command, while Ward used the keyboard to create melody, often switching between the guitar and keyboard such as in  "Invalid Litter Department".

Legacy
At the Drive-In is considered one of the most influential post-hardcore artists of the late 1990s and early 2000s. Accolades for their album Relationship of Command include being ranked 47th in the 50 Greatest Albums of the 21st century in Kerrang!, 83rd on Spin Magazine 100 Greatest Albums 1985–2005, and 90 on MTV2's greatest albums ever list. BBC's Mike Diver stated that the success and eventual "landmark status" of the album helped post-hardcore position itself as a "vital commercial force," adding that Relationship of Command "is the high against which every post-hardcore record since 2000 has been measured."

In October 2011, Rock Sound magazine inducted Relationship of Command into Rock Sound's Hall Of Fame. What remains, however, is a legacy the likes of which may not been seen again."

Among the artists who have cited At the Drive-In as an influence or expressed admiration for them are Billy Talent, Biffy Clyro, Underoath, Will Swan of Dance Gavin Dance, Nick Hipa of As I Lay Dying, The Fall of Troy, Jamie Lenman, Rolo Tomassi, La Dispute, Mutiny on the Bounty, sleepmakeswaves, Jarvis Cocker,  Night Verses, and St Vincent.

Members

Final lineup
 Cedric Bixler-Zavala – lead vocals, occasional guitar, melodica, percussion (1994–2001, 2012, 2016–2018)
 Omar Rodríguez-López – guitar, backing vocals, tambourine (1996–2001, 2012, 2016–2018); bass guitar (1995-1996)
 Paul Hinojos – bass guitar (1996–2001, 2012, 2016–2018)
 Tony Hajjar – drums (1996–2001, 2012, 2016–2018)
 Keeley Davis – guitar, backing vocals (2016–2018) 

Former members
 Jim Ward – guitar, vocals (1994–1996, 1997–2001, 2012), keyboards (1998–2001, 2012)
 Kenny Hopper – bass (1994–1995)
 Jarrett Wrenn – guitar (1994–1995)
 Adam Amparan – guitar (1995-1996)
 Ben Rodriguez – guitar, backing vocals (1996–1997)
 Bernie Rincon – drums (1994-1995; died 1995)
 Davy Simmons – drums (1995)
 Ryan Sawyer – drums (1996)

Timeline

Discography

 Acrobatic Tenement (1997)
 In/Casino/Out (1998)
 Relationship of Command (2000)
 in•ter a•li•a (2017)

See also

 Antemasque
 De Facto
 El Grupo Nuevo de Omar Rodriguez Lopez
 The Mars Volta
 Omar Rodriguez Lopez Group
 Sparta
 Bosnian Rainbows

References

External links
 
 At the Drive-In at Fearless Records
 [ At the Drive-In] at AllMusic

 
Alternative rock groups from Texas
American post-hardcore musical groups
Chicano rock musicians
Fearless Records artists
Musical groups established in 1993
Musical groups disestablished in 2001
Musical groups reestablished in 2012
Musical groups disestablished in 2012
Musical groups reestablished in 2016
1993 establishments in Texas
Musical groups from El Paso, Texas
American punk rock groups